The 2004 Northern Illinois Huskies football team represented Northern Illinois University as a member of the West Division of the Mid-American Conference (MAC) during the 2004 NCAA Division I-A football season. Led by ninth-year head coach Joe Novak, the Huskies compiled an overall record of 9–3 with a mark of 7–1 in conference play, sharing the MAC's West Division title with Toledo. By virtue of their head-to-head win Northern Illinois, Toledo Rockets advanced to the MAC Championship Game. Northern Illinois was invited to the Silicon Valley Football Classic, where they beat Troy. The team played home games at Huskie Stadium in DeKalb, Illinois.

Schedule

References

Northern Illinois
Northern Illinois Huskies football seasons
Silicon Valley Football Classic champion seasons
Northern Illinois Huskies football